The 1904 VMI Keydets football team represented the Virginia Military Institute (VMI) in their 14th season of organized football. The Keydets compiled a 3–5 record in Bill Roper's second and last season as head coach.

Schedule

References

VMI
VMI Keydets football seasons
VMI Keydets football